Folawiyo "Fola" Onibuje (born 25 September 1984) is a Nigerian footballer who plays for Isthmian League Division One North club Cheshunt.

Early life 
Although born in Nigeria, he was educated at Chiswick Community School in West London.

Career 
He earned a contract with Cambridge United for the 2005–06 season after impressing with three goals in as many games in pre-season friendlies. This followed unsuccessful spells at Huddersfield Town, Barnsley and Peterborough United F.C., however having established himself as a first-team player and regular goal scorer at Cambridge he was released at the end of 2005–06.

Onibuje became Swindon manager's Dennis Wise second signing of the 2006 pre-season – signing a three-month contract, which was later extended to a year in late August of the same year. He signed for Brentford on a two-month loan on 10 November 2006 to cover for injured target man Lloyd Owusu, after he was considered surplus to requirements by newly appointed Swindon boss Paul Sturrock. He was recalled by Swindon on 30 December 2006 but on 1 January 2007 he moved clubs again, this time to Wycombe Wanderers. He then signed for St Albans City.

He was released by Wycombe Wanderers on 27 July 2007 with a year still remaining on his contract after failing to impress manager Paul Lambert. He was announced as a non-contract player for Shrewsbury Town on 10 August 2007 however, whilst he impressed, scoring in a reserve game, manager Gary Peters opted not to offer a full-time contract and released him to find a new club.

After training with Conference North side Southport he joined Macclesfield Town in February 2008 on non-contract forms to become Keith Alexander's first signing for the club. However, he was released after making only 1 substitute appearance for the Silkmen.

Onibuje joined Accrington Stanley at the beginning of the 2008–09 season, but made just four substitute league appearances before manager John Coleman released him the following month. He has since had an unsuccessful trial at AFC Bournemouth. Joined Weymouth in March 2009 until the end of the season. He then moved on to Woking, before signing for Grays Athletic on 15 October. He scored three goals in 10 Conference National appearances for Grays, before his release in January 2010.

He signed for Conference North club Southport in 2010, having previously been training with Bradford City.

Onibuje signed for Boreham Wood in October 2010. Before joining Isthmian League Premier Division club Tooting & Mitcham United in August 2011.

References

External links

Profile at UpThePosh! The Peterborough United Database

1984 births
Living people
Nigerian footballers
English Football League players
National League (English football) players
Isthmian League players
Association football forwards
Huddersfield Town A.F.C. players
Barnsley F.C. players
Peterborough United F.C. players
Cambridge United F.C. players
Shrewsbury Town F.C. players
Swindon Town F.C. players
Brentford F.C. players
Wycombe Wanderers F.C. players
Macclesfield Town F.C. players
Accrington Stanley F.C. players
Weymouth F.C. players
Woking F.C. players
Grays Athletic F.C. players
Southport F.C. players
Boreham Wood F.C. players
Tooting & Mitcham United F.C. players
Cheshunt F.C. players